The Burlington Railroad Depot in Nebraska City, also known as the Nebraska City Burlington Depot, and Nebraska City station is a historic train station listed on the National Register of Historic Places.

The station dates to 1912 when it was built in Renaissance Revival style after a prior station proved insufficient for the city's passenger needs.

The museum is slated to form part of the future Nebraska Railroad Museum, whose leaders plan to display a historic railcar in front of the building.

References

See also
National Register of Historic Places listings in Otoe County, Nebraska

National Register of Historic Places in Otoe County, Nebraska
1910s architecture in the United States